Daviesia arthropoda is a species of flowering plant in the family Fabaceae and is endemic to Central Australia. It is a glabrous shrub with widely spreading branches, sharply-pointed, narrowly egg-shaped phyllodes with the narrower end towards the base, and yellow flowers with faint red markings.

Description

Taxonomy and naming
Daviesia arthropoda was first formally described in 1874 by Ferdinand von Mueller in Fragmenta Phytographiae Australiae from specimens collected in Kata Tjuta by Ernest Giles. The specific epithet (arthropoda) means "jointed foot", referring to the peduncles.

Distribution
This species of pea grows on sand dunes with species of spinifex, such as Triodia basedowii,  and Acacia species and is widespread and scattered in Central Australia from the Little Sandy Desert in Western Australia, through the Northern Territory and South Australia to western Queensland.

Conservation status
This daviesia is classified as "Priority Three" by the Government of Western Australia Department of Biodiversity, Conservation and Attractions, meaning that it is poorly known and known from only a few locations but is not under imminent threat but as of "least concern" in the Northern Territory and Queensland.

References

arthropoda
Eudicots of Western Australia
Flora of South Australia
Flora of the Northern Territory
Flora of Queensland
Plants described in 1874
Taxa named by Ferdinand von Mueller